The Great Canadian Appathon (GCA) was a 48-hour game design and development competition open to Canadian college and university students. Students attempted to design, develop and program a working mobile game  within the restrictions of an annually changing game 'theme'. Individuals, or teams of up to four students, worked for 48-hours in designated 'HUBS' set up at participating universities and colleges, to submit their games for a variety of prizes. A number of studios have been founded on the prize money won at the Great Canadian Appathon. This includes Edmonton based 1st place Team Masheen, and Bitshift Games.

Progress

Judging criteria

All the submitted games by GCA participants were be evaluated by game development senior staff on criteria such as the degree of innovation, the fun and entertainment factor, the level of art and design polish as well as stability to determine the winners.

History

March 11th-March 13th 2011

September 30th-October 2nd 2011

September 28th-September 30th 2012

References 

Science and technology in Canada